The sailing events at the 2001 Mediterranean Games took place in Tunis, Tunisia. Athletes competed in three men's and three women's events.

Medal summary

Men's events

Women's events

Medal table

References
Mediterranean Games 2001 Results (PDF file)

Mediterranean Games
Sailing
2001
Sailing competitions in Tunisia